The Eliot Bridge is a bridge over the Charles River between Cambridge, Massachusetts and Allston, Boston, Massachusetts.  It connects Soldiers Field Road in Allston with Gerry's Landing Road, Memorial Drive, Greenough Boulevard, and the Fresh Pond Parkway in Cambridge.

The bridge was built in 1950 as a memorial to Charles W. Eliot, Harvard president 1869–1909, and his son Charles Eliot, landscape architect for the Metropolitan Park Commission.

See also 
List of crossings of the Charles River

References 

Bridges in Boston
Buildings and structures in Cambridge, Massachusetts
Transportation in Cambridge, Massachusetts
Bridges in Middlesex County, Massachusetts
Road bridges in Massachusetts
Bridges over the Charles River
Arch bridges in the United States
1950 establishments in Massachusetts
Bridges completed in 1950